Berkovac (Serbian: Берковац) is a village situated at the north of the Mionica municipality, Kolubara District in Serbia.

Population 
As of September 2011, the population was 443 with a decrease of 2.51% since 2002.

The gender ratio at the time was 51% male & 49% female. The age group are mostly people between 18 and 64 years old, having 60% of the population, followed by 25.7% for people over 65 years & 14.2% for children under 18 years.

The age distribution is mostly people between 50-59 years old. This is a table showing the age distribution as of the 2011 census.

Gallery

References

Populated places in Kolubara District